Rab11 family-interacting protein 1 (Rab11-FIP1) also known as Rab-coupling protein is a protein that in humans is encoded by the RAB11FIP1 gene.

Function 

Proteins of the large Rab GTPase family (see for example RAB1A) have regulatory roles in the formation, targeting, and fusion of intracellular transport vesicles. RAB11FIP1 is one of many proteins that interact with and regulate Rab GTPases. RAB11FIP1 has been identified as a novel protein involved in the regulation of
adiponectin trafficking and release from the adipocyte. RAB11FIP1 expression, which is increased with increasing BMI in humans, inhibits the release of adiponectin from the adipocyte, potentially contributing to lower circulating levels of adiponectin observed in obese populations.

Interactions
RAB11FIP1 has been shown to interact with RAB11A and RAB4A.

References

Further reading